Christopher James Harris (born 28 December 1990) is a rugby union player who plays centre for Gloucester in Premiership Rugby and for Scotland.

Early life and education

Harris was born in Cumbria, England, and attended Trinity School, Carlisle. He played rugby whilst young at Carlisle rugby club. He married long time girlfriend Ruby Wilkinson on 13 August 2022.

He studied at Northumbria University, gaining a 2:1 BSc in Architectural Technology in 2013.

Rugby playing career

Club
Harris was dual registered with Tynedale RFC in National League 1 and also had a loan spell with Rotherham Titans in the Championship. 

In October 2014 Harris made his professional debut for the Newcastle Falcons, scoring a try against București Wolves in the European Challenge Cup. In December 2014, Harris scored two tries on his Premiership debut against Saracens. 

With the Falcons being relegated, Harris joined Gloucester for the start of the 2019-20 season

International
In June 2013, Harris scored a try for England Counties XV against Belgium. 

In October 2017, Harris received his first call up to the senior Scotland squad by coach Gregor Townsend for the Autumn Internationals. Harris is Scottish qualified through his Edinburgh born grandmother. On 11 November 2017, Harris made his test debut at Murrayfield against Samoa. Harris started in the first Six Nations game against Wales in 2018. He scored his first try for Scotland in a game vs Italy 2019 Six Nations, scoring just minutes after making an appearance off the bench and scored the winning try for Scotland against France at Murrayfield. He appeared for Scotland in the 2019 Rugby World Cup fixtures and continued his form to play in every match for 2020 Six Nations.

Harris played in all five matches of the 2021 Six Nations, including stirring away victories at both Twickenham and in Paris. Gregor Townsend said that Harris was one of Scotland's "defensive leaders."

British & Irish Lions tour to South Africa, 2021
Harris was selected in the starting line-up for the second Test match.

References

External links

profile at Gloucester Rugby
Newcastle Falcons Profile

1990 births
Living people
Alumni of Northumbria University
English people of Scottish descent
Gloucester Rugby players
Newcastle Falcons players
Rotherham Titans players
Rugby union centres
Rugby union players from Carlisle, Cumbria
Scotland international rugby union players
Scottish rugby union players
British & Irish Lions rugby union players from England
British & Irish Lions rugby union players from Scotland